Qaleh Rudkhan (also Romanized as Qal‘eh Rūdkhān and Qal‘eh-ye Rūdkhān; also known as Kala-Rudkhan and Qala Rūdkhan) is a village in Gurab Pas Rural District, in the Central District of Fuman County, Gilan Province, Iran. At the 2006 census, its population was 707, in 217 families.

References 

Populated places in Fuman County